Eduard Mikael V. Nielsen (8 May 1923 – 23 May 2017) was a Danish theologian.

He was a professor at the University of Copenhagen from 1956 to 1991. He was a fellow of the Norwegian Academy of Science and Letters from 1987.

References

1923 births
2017 deaths
Danish theologians
Members of the Norwegian Academy of Science and Letters
Academic staff of the University of Copenhagen